Jennifer Hiller  (born ) is a retired Australian volleyball player, who played as a libero.

She was part of the Australia women's national volleyball team at the 2002 FIVB Volleyball Women's World Championship in Germany. 
On club level she played with Eastside Hawks.

Clubs
 Monash University (2002)

References

1979 births
Living people
Australian women's volleyball players
Place of birth missing (living people)
Liberos
Monash University alumni